Shijiazhuang Tiangong F.C. was a semi-professional football club based in Shijiazhuang, Hebei, China.

History
The club was founded in 2007 as a semi-professional football club before it was able to gain enough money to successfully register itself as a professional football club in 2008 to play at the bottom of the Chinese football league pyramid. They would rename themselves Hebei Tiangong and would come second in the Northern Group before being knocked out of the play-offs by Hunan Billows 2–1 in the first round. At the end of the season, they returned to be a semi-professional football club and did not compete in the league the following season.

References

External links
Website

Defunct football clubs in China

Football clubs in China
2007 establishments in China
Association football clubs established in 2007
Association football clubs disestablished in 2009